is a former Japanese football player and manager. His wife is former footballer Asako Takakura he is the current manager WE League club of Tokyo Verdy Beleza.

Coaching career
Takemoto was born in Aichi Prefecture on November 22, 1955. He started coaching career at Yomiuri in 1980. He coached youth team and women's team Yomiuri-Seiyu Beleza until 1996. In 1999, he signed with Gamba Osaka and he became assistant coach until 2004. He also managed the club as Hiroshi Hayano successor in 2001. In 2005, he moved to Kashiwa Reysol and he became assistant coach.

Managerial statistics

References

External links

1955 births
Living people
Waseda University alumni
Association football people from Aichi Prefecture
Japanese footballers
Japanese football managers
J1 League managers
Gamba Osaka managers
Kashiwa Reysol managers
Association footballers not categorized by position